Bolognese sauce (known in Italian as ragù alla bolognese, ragù bolognese, or simply ragù) is a meat-based sauce in Italian cuisine, typical of the city of Bologna. It is customarily used to dress tagliatelle al ragù and to prepare lasagne alla bolognese.

Italian ragù alla bolognese is a slowly cooked meat-based sauce, and its preparation involves several techniques, including sweating, sautéing and braising. Ingredients include a characteristic soffritto of onion, celery and carrot, different types of minced or finely chopped beef, often alongside small amounts of fatty pork. White wine, milk, and a small amount of tomato paste or tomatoes are added, and the dish is then gently simmered at length to produce a thick sauce.

Outside Italy, the phrase "Bolognese sauce" is often used to refer to a tomato-based sauce to which minced meat has been added; such sauces typically bear little resemblance to the Italian ragù alla bolognese, being more similar in fact to the ragù alla napoletana from the tomato-rich south of the country. Although in Italy ragù alla bolognese is not used with spaghetti (but rather with flat pasta, like tagliatelle), so-called "spaghetti bolognese" has become a popular dish in many other parts of the world.

History
The origins of the Bolognese ragù are related to those of the French ragoût, a stew of ingredients reduced to small pieces, which became popular in the 18th century. 

The earliest documented recipe for a ragù served with pasta comes from late 18th century Imola, near Bologna, from Alberto Alvisi, cook of the local Cardinal Barnaba Chiaramonti, later Pope Pius VII.

In 1891 Pellegrino Artusi published a recipe for a ragù characterized as bolognese in his cookbook. Artusi's recipe, which he called Maccheroni alla bolognese, is thought to derive from the mid 19th century when he spent considerable time in Bologna (maccheroni being a generic term for pasta, both dried and fresh). The sauce called for predominantly lean veal filet along with pancetta, butter, onion, and carrot. The meats and vegetables were to be finely minced, cooked with butter until the meats browned, then covered and cooked with broth. No tomato sauce was foreseen. Artusi commented that the taste could be made even more pleasant by adding small pieces of dried mushroom, a few slices of truffle, or chicken liver cooked with the meat and diced. As a final touch, he also suggested adding half a glass of cream to the sauce when it was completely done to make it taste even smoother. Artusi recommended serving this sauce with a medium size pasta ("horse teeth") made from durum wheat. The pasta was to be made fresh, cooked until it was firm, and then flavored with the sauce and Parmigiano cheese.

Evolution and variations
Since Artusi recorded and subsequently published his recipe for Maccheroni alla bolognese, what is now ragù alla bolognese has evolved with the cuisine of the region. Most notable is the preferred choice of pasta, which today is widely recognized as fresh tagliatelle. Another reflection of the evolution of the cuisine since its inception, is the addition of tomato, either as a puree or as a concentrated paste, to the common mix of ingredients. Similarly, both wine and milk appear today in the list of ingredients in many of the contemporary recipes, and beef has mostly displaced veal as the dominant meat.

In 1982, the Italian Academy of Cuisine (Accademia Italiana della Cucina), an organization dedicated to preserving the culinary heritage of Italy, recorded and deposited a recipe for "classic Bolognese ragù" with the Bologna Chamber of Commerce (La Camera di Commercio di Bologna). A version of the academy's recipe for American kitchens was also published. The academy's recipe confines the ingredients to beef cut from the plate section (cartella di manzo), fresh unsmoked pancetta (pancetta di maiale distesa), onions, carrot, celery, passata (or tomato purée), meat broth, dry white wine, milk, salt and pepper.

Nowadays, there are many variations of the recipe even among native Italian chefs, and the repertoire has been further broadened by some American chefs known for their expertise in Italian cuisine.

Ragù alla bolognese is a complex sauce which involves various cooking techniques, including sweating, sautéing and braising. As such, it lends itself well to interpretation and adaptation by professional chefs and home cooks alike. Common sources of differences include which meats to use (beef, pork or veal) and their relative quantities, the possible inclusion of either cured meats or offal, which fats are used in the sauté phases (rendered pork fat, butter, olive or vegetable oil), what form of tomato is employed (fresh, canned or paste), the makeup of the cooking liquids (wine, milk, tomato juices, or broth) and their specific sequence of addition.

The numerous variations among recipes for ragù alla bolognese have led many to search for the definitive, authentic recipe. Some have suggested the recipe registered by the Accademia Italiana della Cucina in 1982 as the "most authentic".

However, this would be inconsistent with the academy's own beliefs and statements about remaining faithful to tradition in documenting and preserving Italy's culinary heritage. The Milan-born chef Mario Caramella stated, "In Italy, there are several traditional recipes of tagliatelle al ragù alla bolognese with more or less slight variations". According to UK cookbook author and food writer Felicity Cloake, "The fact is that there is no definitive recipe for a bolognese meat sauce, but to be worthy of the name, it should respect the traditions of the area", a view that is consistent with that often expressed by the Italian Academy of Cuisine.

The many variations tend to be based on a common theme. For instance, garlic is absent from all of the recipes mentioned above, as are herbs other than the parsimonious use of bay leaves by some. Seasoning is limited to salt, pepper and the occasional pinch of nutmeg. In all of the recipes, meats dominate as the principal ingredient, while tomatoes, in one form or another, are only an auxiliary ingredient.

Traditional service and use

In Bologna ragù is traditionally paired and served with tagliatelle made with eggs and northern Italy's soft wheat flour. Acceptable alternatives to fresh tagliatelle include other broad flat pasta shapes, such as pappardelle or fettuccine, and tube shapes, such as rigatoni and penne. While the combination of the ragù with fresh tagliatelle remains the most traditional and authentic in the Bolognese cuisine, some - such as Piero Valdiserra - have argued in favour of capitalizing on its already internationally widespread combination with spaghetti, even by attempting to portray it as not entirely foreign to local tradition.

Ragù alla bolognese along with béchamel is also used to prepare traditional baked lasagne in Bolognese style.

Spaghetti bolognese

Spaghetti bolognese (sometimes called spaghetti alla bolognese) is a pasta dish that is popular outside Italy, but not part of traditional Bolognese or even Italian cuisine in general. The dish is generally perceived as inauthentic when encountered by Italians abroad.

It consists of spaghetti served with a sauce made from tomatoes, minced beef, garlic, wine and herbs; sometimes minced beef can be replaced by other minced meats. In this sense the sauce is actually more similar to Neapolitan ragù from the south of Italy than the northern Bolognese version of ragù.
 
The dish is often served with grated Parmesan on top, but local cheeses, such as grated cheddar are also often used. It may be served with a larger proportion of sauce to pasta than is common in Italian spaghetti dishes. The sauce may be laid on top of the pasta (rather than being mixed in, in the Italian manner) or even served separately from it, leaving diners to mix it in themselves.

The origins of the dish are unclear, but it may have evolved in the context of early twentieth-century emigration of southern Italians to the Americas (particularly the United States) as a sort of fusion influenced by the tomato-rich style of Neapolitan ragù or it may have developed in immigrant restaurants in Britain in the post war era. The first mention of this combination appeared in the book Practical Italian recipes for American kitchens, written by Julia Lovejoy Cuniberti in 1917, and published to raise funds for the families of Italian soldiers, at the time fighting in World War I. In the book bolognese sauce is recommended for "macaroni or spaghetti". The latter were in fact already widespread in the United States, unlike tagliatelle, traditionally made fresh and difficult to export due to the fragility of their consistence. In countries where it is common, the sauce is often used for lasagne in place of ragù alla bolognese as in Bologna and elsewhere in Italy.

See also

 List of pasta dishes
 Makarony po-flotski
 Neapolitan ragù
 Spaghetti and meatballs

References

Further reading
 Hazen, Marcella The Classic Italian Cookbook Knopf.

External links

 Accademia Italiana della Cucina (Italian Academy of Cuisine)
 CIBO-Culinary Institute of Bologna original Ragu Bolognese sauce recipe

Culture in Bologna
Cuisine of Emilia-Romagna
Ground meat
Italian sauces
Meat-based sauces
Tomato sauces